KFIS (104.1 MHz) is a commercial FM radio station licensed to Scappoose, Oregon, and serving the Portland metropolitan area.   It is owned by the Salem Media Group and airs a Contemporary Christian (CCM) radio format.  As with other Salem CCM stations in cities such as Los Angeles and Atlanta, KFIS uses the branding "The Fish", a symbol was often used by the early Christian church.

The studios and offices are on SE Lake Road in Southeast Portland off the Milwaukie Expressway.  The transmitter is off SW Fairmount Court in Portland.

History
In April 1981, the station first signed on the air as KTIL-FM in Tillamook, and was the FM counterpart to KTIL (AM 1590).  The two stations simulcasted a full service middle of the road format of popular music, news and sports, and were owned by the Beaver Broadcasting Company.  Because Tillamook is nearly 50 miles from Portland, separated by tall mountains, the station was not audible in Oregon's largest radio market.  In 1999, the station's call letters were changed to KJUN, and flipped to an oldies format.

In 2000, Salem Media bought KJUN for $35.8 million.  The station already had a construction permit from the Federal Communications Commission to move its city of license to Scappoose and relocate its transmitter to Portland in order to give the station better coverage of the market.  However, its signal is not as strong as many other Portland FM stations, which have an effective radiated power of 100,000 watts.  KFIS is powered at 6,900 watts and is a Class C2 and has an effective radiated power of 50,000 watts (7,000 with beam tilt).

Salem changed the station's call letters to KFIS to reflect the "Fish" branding for its Contemporary Christian format.  On September 1, 2001, it signed on from its new location, joining Salem's existing Portland stations KPDQ and KPDQ-FM, which air Christian talk and teaching formats.

An FM station in the Tillamook area of Oregon, KIXT, switched its call sign to KTIL-FM in 2006.

See also
 List of radio stations in Washington

References

External links
KFIS official website

FIS
FIS
Scappoose, Oregon
Radio stations established in 1981
1981 establishments in Oregon
Salem Media Group properties